1975 may refer to:

 A number in the 1000 (number) range.

Time
 1975 A.D. (MCMLXXV), a year in the Common Era
 1975 BC, a year in the Before Common Era

Places
 1975 (1969 PH) Pikelner; the asteroid #1975, see List of minor planets: 1001–2000

Other
"1975", a song by Gene Clark from his album White Light

See also

 
 
 The 1975 (disambiguation)
 M1975 (disambiguation)
 75 (disambiguation)